Horn most often refers to:

Horn (acoustic), a conical or bell shaped aperture used to guide sound
 Horn (instrument), collective name for tube-shaped wind musical instruments
Horn (anatomy), a pointed, bony projection on the head of various animals, either the "true" horn, or other horn-like growths
 Horn, a colloquial reference to keratin, the substance that is the main component of the tissue that sheaths the bony core of horns and hoofs of various animals

Horn may also refer to:

Audio
 Horn loudspeaker
 Vehicle horn
 Train horn

Musical Instruments

Brass Instruments 

 French horn (often simply called a horn), a family of brass instruemnts
 German horn, the most common type of french horn
 Vienna horn, a type of horn used particularly in Vienna, Austria
 Natural horn, the predecessor to the modern french horn
 Post horn, a natural horn with a cupped mouthpiece
 Saxhorn, a family of brass instruments with conical bores
 Flugelhorn, a conical brass instrument similar to a trumpet or cornet
 Tenor Horn (sometimes known as an alto horn), a conical brass instrument usually in the key of E-flat
 Baritone Horn (often simply called a baritone) a conical brass instrument similar to a Euphonium
 Alphorn (or Alpine horn), a long wooden natural horn

Woodwind Instruments 

 Basset Horn, a member of the Clarinet family
 Cor anglais (or English horn), a member of the Oboe family

Personal name
 Horn (surname)
 Freyja, also known as Hörn, a Norse goddess of love, beauty, fertility, war and death

Places
 Cape Horn, the southernmost point of South America
 Horn of Africa, a peninsula in northeast Africa
 Horn (district), a district of the state of Lower Austria in Austria
 Horn, Austria, a small town, capital of the Horn District
 Horn, Germany, a municipality in Rhineland-Palatinate, Germany
 Horn, Hamburg, a quarter in the borough Hamburg-Mitte, in the eastern part of Hamburg, Germany
 Horn (Netherlands), a town in the Dutch province of Limburg, and a separate municipality until 1991
 Horn, Oppland, a ferry docking point on the east side of Randsfjorden, a lake in Norway
 Horn, Rutland, a civil parish in the East Midlands of England
 Horn, Sweden, a locality
 Horn, Switzerland, a municipality in the district in the canton of Thurgau
 Horn, Nebraska, a community in the United States
 Horn Island, Queensland, one of the Torres Strait Islands
 Horn River, Northwest Territories, Canada 
 Horn (Schwarzbach), a river in eastern France and southwestern Germany
 The Horn (Mount Buffalo), a peak in Victoria, Australia
 The Horn (New Hampshire), a peak in the northeastern United States

Music
 Horn (album), an album by Pharaoh Overlord
 Horn (Apink album), 2022
 "The Horn", a song from the album Love Kraft by Super Furry Animals
 "The Horn", from the album Derek and Clive Ad Nauseam, a comedy track by Derek and Clive

Slang
Telephone, also known as "the horn"
Two-way radio, also known as "the horn"

Other uses
 Horn (Chinese constellation), part of the European constellation Virgo
 Horn (diacritic), a diacritic mark used to indicate that a normally rounded vowel such as o or u is to be pronounced unrounded
 Horn Cable Television, a television channel in Somalia
 The knob-like appendage attached to the pommel of a saddle
 Horn antenna, a type of antenna shaped like a horn and also called "horn"
 Glacial horn, a pyramid-shaped peak sculpted by glacial erosion
 Control horn, a device that helps control the control surfaces of an aircraft
 Horn (video game), a mobile game

See also

 
 Horned God
 Horns (disambiguation)
 Horne (disambiguation)
 Hoorn (disambiguation)